This is a list of Commonwealth of Nations countries by GDP in nominal values. Gross domestic product is the value of all final goods and services produced within a nation in a given year. The GDP dollar estimates presented here are calculated at market or government official exchange rates. Values are given in millions of US dollars. Dependent territories are shown in italics and are not ranked, and their flags are shown alongside the country of which they are a territory.

The following lists show the latest figures for GDP and GDP per capita. Most figures are 2017 data from the International Monetary Fund; figures for dependent territories (both GDP and GDP per capita) are 2016 data from the United Nations. Figures from other sources and years are noted as such.

Click on one of the small triangles in the headings to re-order the list according to that category.

See also 
 Commonwealth free trade
 Commonwealth banknote-issuing institutions
 Organisation of African, Caribbean and Pacific States
 Lomé Convention / Cotonou Agreement
 List of countries by leading trade partners
 List of stock exchanges in the Commonwealth of Nations
 List of stock exchanges in the United Kingdom, the British Crown Dependencies and United Kingdom Overseas Territories
 List of national and international statistical services

Notes

References 

GDP
UK, Commonwealth of Nations
GDP